The list of shipwrecks in 2020 includes ships sunk, foundered, grounded, or otherwise lost during 2020.

January

4 January

7 January

10 January

11 January

14 January

17 January

21 January

24 January

26 January

27 January

February

3 February

10 February

11 February

15 February

16 February

17 February

24 February

27 February

29 February

March

5 March

9 March

12 March

14 March

17 March

20 March

25 March

28 March

29 March

30 March

31 March

April

2 April

3 April

10 April

26 April

27 April

May

1 May

2 May

4 May

10 May

30 May

June

4 June

9 June

12 June

15 June

25 June

27 June

29 June

30 June

July

12 July

14 July

16 July

17 July

19 July

24 July

25 July

26 July

27 July

31 July

August

1 August

2 August

4 August

11 August

13 August

15 August

20 August

27 August

30 August

31 August

September

3 September

5 September

7 September

10 September

11 September

12 September

16 September

20 September

21 September

22 September

26 September

October

8 October

10 October

11 October

13 October

14 October

15 October

17 October

23 October

24 October

24 October

25 October

26 October

27 October

29 October

30 October

November

2 November

3 November

6 November

8 November

9 November

10 November

11 November

12 November

13 November

17 November

18 November

20 November

23 November

25 November

28 November

December

3 December

5 December

10 December

13 December

15 December

17 December

18 December

19 December

21 December

24 December

26 December

28 December

29 December

31 December

Unknown date

References

Shipwrecks
2020